This is a list of currently active separatist movements in South America. Separatism includes autonomism and secessionism. What is and is not considered an autonomist or secessionist movement is sometimes contentious. Entries on this list must meet three criteria:
They are active movements with living, active members.
They are seeking greater autonomy or self-determination for a geographic region.
They are citizens/peoples of the conflict area and not from another country.

Under each region listed is one or more of the following:
De facto state: for regions with de facto autonomy from the government
Proposed state: proposed name for a seceding sovereign state
Proposed autonomous area: for movements toward greater autonomy for an area but not outright secession
De facto autonomous government: for governments with de facto autonomous control over a region
Government-in-exile: for a government based outside of the region in question, with or without control
Political party (or parties): for political parties involved in a political system to push for autonomy or secession
Militant organisation(s): for armed organisations
Advocacy group(s): for non-belligerent, non-politically participatory entities
Ethnic/ethno-religious/racial/regional/religious group(s)

Argentina
 Mendoza
 Proposed state:  República de Mendoza
 Advocacy group: Mendoexit
 Araucanía

 Advocacy groups: Consejo de Todas las Tierras, Resistencia Ancestral Mapuche
 Proposed state or autonomous area:  Wallmapu

 Patagonia

Bolivia 
 Nación Camba

 Qullasuyu

Media Luna

Brazil 

 São Paulo
Proposed state:  São Paulo
 Advocacy group: Movimento República de São Paulo
 Proposition: To separate the São Paulo state from Brazil
 Sul
 Proposed state:  Sul
 Advocacy group: The South is My Country
 Proposition: To separate the states of the southern region, Paraná, Santa Catarina and Rio Grande do Sul creating a confederation between them.
 Amazonas
 Proposed state:  Republic of the Peoples of the Amazon

Chile 

 Chiloé Province

 Proposed automous state:  Chiloé
 Advocacy group: Movimiento Archipiélago Soberano

 Araucanía
 Advocacy group: Consejo de Todas las Tierras, Resistencia Ancestral Mapuche
 Proposed state or autonomous area:  Wallmapu

Colombia

 San Andrés y Providencia
 Proposed state:  San Andrés y Providencia
 Advocacy group:  (AMEN-SD)
 Proposition: Self determination for the Raizal people.

France
 French Guiana
 Proposition: Independence of French Guiana from France or status as overseas territory
 Advocacy group: Decolonization and Social Emancipation Movement

Peru 
 Sur-Peruana

 Qullasuyu

United Kingdom 
 Falkland Islands

Venezuela 
 Zulia

See also
Lists of active separatist movements
List of historical separatist movements

References

Separatist Movements, Active
Separatist Movements In South America, Active
 South America
Separatist Movements In South America, Active
South America